Henry Greville Montgomery (1863 – 2 December 1951) was a British Liberal Party politician, newspaper proprietor, and leading figure in the brickwork business. He was the Member of Parliament (MP) for  Bridgwater from 1906 to 1910.

Background
He was the son of Hugh and Eliza Montgomery. He was educated privately. He first married Florence Shepherd. He then married Emily Lewis. He was a descendant of the poet James Montgomery.

Professional career
In 1892 he founded The British Clayworker, the organ of the Brick and Tile Trades. In 1895 as an outcome of this, the Institute of Clayworkers was inaugurated. In 1895 he revived the Building Trades Exhibition at Royal Agricultural Hall, London, subsequently held at Olympia. In 1903 he inaugurated the first Colliery Exhibition held in Britain. In 1908 he was also involved in the world's Mining Exhibition held at the Olympia in London. He was a Master of the Tylers' and Bricklayers' Company. He was a Member of Council of the Royal Drawing Society. He was an Honorary member of Royal Institute of British Architects. He was Patron of the living of Norton Malreward, Somerset. He served as a Justice of the Peace in Norfolk.

Political career
He was Private Secretary to William Sproston Caine MP, Lord Yarborough and the Dowager Duchess of Montrose.
He was Liberal candidate for the Bridgwater Division of Somerset at the 1906 General Election. It was the first time he had stood for parliament. He was not expected to win as the seat had been Unionist since it was created in 1885. In fact, the Liberal party had not even bothered to field a candidate at the two previous elections. However, in 1906 the country swung behind the Liberals and he gained Bridgwater by the margin of just 17 votes.

The Liberal party Chief Whip at the time, Jack Pease described Montgomery as "a decent man" who warranted "no great attention", adding "nor did he possess much weight". After serving one parliamentary term he did not defend his seat at the January 1910 general election.

Election results

References

External links 
 

1863 births
1951 deaths
UK MPs 1906–1910
Liberal Party (UK) MPs for English constituencies